Edmund J. (Ed) Barney (January 23, 1890 – October 4, 1967) was a Major League Baseball outfielder. In 88 career games, he had a .224 batting average with 61 hits in 272 at-bats. He batted left and threw right-handed.

Barney was born in Amery, Wisconsin and died in Rice Lake, Wisconsin.

References

External links

Pittsburgh Pirates players
New York Yankees players
Major League Baseball outfielders
Minor league baseball managers
Meriden Hopes players
Hartford Senators players
Jersey City Skeeters players
Louisville Colonels (minor league) players
Buffalo Bisons (minor league) players
Seattle Indians players
Shreveport Gassers players
Quebec Bulldogs (baseball) players
Baseball players from Wisconsin
People from Amery, Wisconsin
1890 births
1967 deaths